Richard William Hunt (11 April 1908 – 13 November 1979) was a scholar, grammarian, palaeographer, editor, and author of a number of books about medieval history. He began his career as a lecturer in palaeography at Liverpool University, and worked at Bush House during World War II. In 1945 he obtained the position of Keeper of the Western Manuscripts at the Bodleian Library, and he relocated to Oxford, remaining in the position until 1975.

On 11 December 1939 he married Edith Irene Joyce Twamley at Spondon. She died from complications of pregnancy on 7 December 1940. On 14 February 1942 Hunt remarried to Katharine (Kit) Eva Rowland (1913/14–1977), daughter of timber merchant Harry Rowland of Parkgate, Cheshire. Three sons were born to them, including Tim Hunt.

On Hunt's retirement from the Bodleian in 1975, he was honoured with an Oxford exhibition, The Survival of Ancient Literature, as well as a collection of essays. His death in 1980 was marked by a second major exhibition, Manuscripts at Oxford.

Notes

British medievalists
1908 births
1979 deaths
Bodley's Librarians
Linguists from the United Kingdom
English palaeographers
Corresponding Fellows of the Medieval Academy of America
20th-century linguists